Thomas Jessop (born 19 January 1985), is a British actor. He is the first actor with Down syndrome to star in a prime-time BBC drama, the first professional actor with Down syndrome to tour theatres as Hamlet, and the first to become a full voting member of BAFTA. In 2021 he was awarded an Honorary Doctor of the Arts by the University of Winchester and became an Ambassador to Mencap and to the National Down syndrome Policy Group.

He has commented that disabled actors need opportunities to appear other than as victims or objects of pity.

Career

Film
Jessop has a portfolio of short films to his name and cameo appearances in feature films including Day of the Flowers. His lead role in Fighter won him Best Actor at the Oska Bright Film Festival and Best Film at Film London, and was named Short of the Week at the BFI London Film Festival. He appeared in Down & Out and Innocence, the latter of which won the Don Quixote Award at Kraków Film Festival. Jessop also played a fisherman in Little Shit and a football fan in Delilah.

Television
In 2007, Jessop starred opposite Nicholas Hoult in the feature-length BBC drama Coming Down the Mountain. The writer Mark Haddon said Jessop was the inspiration behind the project. Jessop's performance was widely praised, and the film was nominated for a Television BAFTA for "Best Single Drama", before winning the RADAR People of the Year Human Rights Media Award 2008. Jessop made his television debut in Holby City, and has also appeared as guest lead in two episodes of  Casualty, Monroe and Doctors. His dream is to appear on EastEnders.

In June 2015, he appeared in two "Blue Badge" specials of Off Their Rockers on ITV.

Jessop starred in BBC's Line of Duty, appearing as Terry Boyle in the fifth series in 2019. He reprised his role as a returning character in three dramatic episodes in the sixth series of Line of Duty in 2021.

Theatre
Jessop is a founding member of award-winning integrated company Blue Apple Theatre, and has appeared in all their productions to date. In 2010, he played Bottom in A Midsummer Night's Dream. In 2011, he was the Mayor in Gogol's The Government Inspector. In May 2012, Jessop made history when he became the first professional actor with Down syndrome to play the title role of Hamlet in Blue Apple's touring production. This led to an invitation from Mark Rylance to take part in his What You Will Pop up Shakespeare and the Globe Theatre Sonnet Walks. In March and April 2013, Tommy played the role of Bobby, a victim of hate crime in Living Without Fear, Blue Apple Theatre's touring production about disability hate crime. Jessop has also performed the roles of Prospero in The Tempest and Don Pedro in Much Ado About Nothing,  Marley's Ghost in A Christmas Carol, and The Creature in Frankenstein.

Documentary
Jessop frequently collaborates with his brother, the writer and filmmaker Will Jessop. In 2007, the brothers made the broadcast documentary Tommy's Story for Community Channel (UK). William filmed Tommy behind the scenes of Coming Down the Mountain and Holby City, and was shortlisted for Best Newcomer at the Grierson Awards 2008. In February 2014, Jessop was one of the stars of Growing Up Down's, a documentary about Blue Apple Theatre's touring production of Hamlet that William produced and directed for BBC Three. The film was described as "BBC Three at its very best"  and in November 2014 won the Creative Diversity Network Award for Most Groundbreaking Programme.

In 2022, Jessop investigated why people with a learning disability are more than twice as likely to die from avoidable causes than the rest of the population as part of a BBC Panorama entitled Will the NHS Care for Me?

Radio
Jessop has starred in various radio productions for the BBC, including an episode of the series Stone with Hugo Speer in 2010, and the one-off play The Climb opposite Warwick Davis in 2011. On 10 April 2013, Jessop appeared in an episode of The Archers, playing Callum Longfield.

Awards
In July 2021, Jessop received an honorary Doctorate of Arts from the University of Winchester for his services to the entertainment industry.

References

External links

Growing Up Down's documentary website

English male soap opera actors
1985 births
Living people
Disability theatre
Actors from Winchester
Actors with Down syndrome